Mihály Szemes (23 July 1920 – 3 October 1977) was a Hungarian film director. He directed nineteen films between 1947 and 1973. His 1961 film Alba Regia was entered into the 2nd Moscow International Film Festival where it won the Silver Prize.

Selected filmography
 Alba Regia (1961)

References

External links

1920 births
1977 deaths
Hungarian film directors
Film people from Budapest